This is a list of international schools in Taiwan:

Hsinchu

 Hsinchu American School
 Hsinchu County American School
 Hsinchu International School
 International Bilingual School at Hsinchu Science Park
 Pacific American School
 Kang Chiao International School Hsinchu Campus

Kaohsiung

 Dominican International School Kaohsiung
 I-Shou International School
 Kaohsiung American School
 Kivam Junior High school
 Morrison Academy Kaohsiung

Keelung

 Er Xin Elementary School

Nantou County

 Taiwan Adventist International School
 Pu Tai Senior High School

Taichung

 American School in Taichung
 Ivy Collegiate Academy
 Mingdao High School Global Citizenship Program (International Department)
Anglo-Chinese School (Taiwan)
 Morrison Academy
 Hong Wen International School
Wagor International School
Starlight International School

Taipei and New Taipei City

 Dominican International School
 Grace Christian Academy
 Kang Chiao International Schools Taipei Campus
 Taipei Adventist American School
 Taipei American School
 Taipei European School
 Taipei International Christian Academy
 Taipei Japanese School
 The Primacy Collegiate Academy
 Asia American International Academy External Site
 Kang Chiao International School Linkou Campus
 Morrison Academy 
 VIS@betterworld lab Experimental Education Institution

Taoyuan

 Taoyuan American School 
 Yoder Bilingual Academy(External Site)
The school offers an American Standards-based curriculum and is accredited by the Taoyuan Board of Education. 
 Yoder International Academy(External Site)

Tainan 

 International Bilingual School at Tainan-Science-Park()
 Wilson International American School 
 Tainan International Academy
 Yinghai International High School

Yilan

 United Education U.S.A

See also

 List of international schools

 
international
Taiwan